"The Menehune Mystery" is a 32-page Disney comics story written and drawn by Carl Barks, and lettered by his wife Garé Barks. Mrs. Barks had grown up in Hawaii and suggested elements of the story to her husband. "Menehune" was first published in Uncle Scrooge #4 (December 1953-February 1954). Characters in the story include Donald Duck, his nephews Huey, Dewey, and Louie, the Beagle Boys, and Uncle Scrooge. The story has been reprinted many times.

Plot
Uncle Scrooge is concerned about the safety and security of his fortune. He has reduced his fortune to $1,000,000 bills and has the bills canned like spinach. Scrooge wants to ship the load to a remote island near Hawaii, but the Beagle Boys take over the ship and force Scrooge, Donald, and the nephews to do the dirty work on the voyage. Once in Hawaii, the Ducks are helped by the Menehunes, and the Beagle Boys are captured by the United States Navy.

See also
List of Disney comics by Carl Barks

References
 
 
 

Disney comics stories
Donald Duck comics by Carl Barks
1953 in comics
Scrooge McDuck
Comics set on islands
Hawaii in fiction
Works about the United States Navy